Ravi Vadlamani (born 21 July 1956) is a chartered Accountant by profession, Senior Partner in M/s Umamaheswara Rao & Co., a social entrepreneur, philanthropist, was elected as Director on the Board of Rotary International through an election process. He is past District Governor Rotary International (Dist.3150), President, Round Table India,  Chairman Indian Red Cross Society, Guntur.

Education and personal life
He obtained his Bachelor of Commerce degree from TJPS College Andhra University. He also did his Chartered Accountancy, A.C.S., F.C.A. Fund Managers Course Conducted by Unit Trust of India. Merchant Banking Course Conducted by Unit Trust of India. Fellow Member, The Institute of Chartered Accountants of India. Member, The Institute of Company Secretaries of India.

Career
He started his career as a Chartered Accountant in M/s Umamaheswara Rao & Co., As a professional Chartered Accountant, he handled tax matters of  Corporate, Non-Corporate and Not-for-Profit Organizations and represented clients at various levels of Income Tax Department of Government of India. He also conducted central audits for various public sector banks in India, including State Bank of India, Canara Bank, Pinakini Grameena Bank and Indian Bank. 
He also led teams conducting official audits for public sector corporations like Power Grid Corporation of India, National Thermal Power Corporation Limited, Hindustan Petroleum Corporation Ltd, Visakha Refinery, Bharat Heavy Plates & Vessels Ltd, National Mineral Development Corporation, the State Trading Corporation of India Ltd.

Professional affiliation
He represented five Southern States as the Regional Council Member of the Institute of Chartered Accountants of India for three years from 1988 to 1991. 
He was also the chairman, Professional Development Committee of the Southern India Regional Council of The Institute of Chartered Accountants of India in the year 1989, Company Law Committee of the Southern India Regional Council of The Institute of Chartered Accountants of India - 1988.
He was also Member, Taxation and Corporate Laws Sub-Committee of the Federation of Indian Chambers of Commerce & Industry (FICCI), New Delhi from 1998 to 2002.
He served as the chairman, Public Relations Committee of the Southern India Regional Council of the Institute of Chartered Accountants of India (ICAI) in 1991. Ravi Vadlamani worked as vice-chairman, Guntur Branch of the Southern India Regional Council of The Institute of Chartered Accountants of India - 1998.

Service to the society
Ravi has participated in social service programmes of Rotary International. Over the years, he served in different capacities and was elected as the Director of Rotary International. He is the first from Telugu States (Andhra Pradesh and Telangana) in India to have been elected to the coveted post of International director in Rotary in its history. Ravi defeated two rivals in a three-cornered contest. He would join the board of directors of Rotary International in July, 2021 and serve in the role for two years.
The results of the two-month-long process of online polling were declared on March 4, 2020. As many as 1405 members from 824 clubs in 9 rotary districts spread over the States of Andhra Pradesh, Telangana, Karnataka, Goa and Maharashtra exercised their franchise.
Earlier, he served as the District Governor of RI district 3150.
During his tenure as District Governor and also in the succeeding years, he has taken an active role in providing 10,000 bore-wells under "Water for Life" program of Rotary International in villages of Guntur, Prakasam, Khammam, Warangal, Nizamabad, Kamareddy, Rangareddy and Adilabad Districts. 
Overhead Reservoirs were built for serving protected drinking water through the distribution networks under the "Water for Life" program  in Kothagudem, Katarivaripalem, Nizampatnam and Piduguralla Areas.
He participated in the project that provided more than 300 Reverse Osmosis Water Plants in Guntur, Prakasam in Andhra Pradesh and many  Telangana Districts, where people are affected by Endemic Skeletal Fluorosis, at a cost of Rs. 5 crores (INR 50 million).
He was associated with the project of construction of a check-dam to irrigate farm fields with a view to meeting the needs of several farmers in Kothagudem area.  More than 30 mini Protected Water Schemes and over 400 open wells in several villages of Coastal Districts of the Nizampatnam area were also dug as part of the program. Ravi participated in a programme that has provided irrigation facility to help poor and marginal farmers through over 300 tube wells in Guntur and Prakasam Districts of Andhra Pradesh.

He conceived and implemented a program called ‘School on Wheels’, to promote education by drawing child labour and children of wage earners to the process of learning. He provided a bus as part of 'School on Wheels' through ‘Child and Police’ Programme at Guntur at a cost of Rs.12.50 lakhs (INR 1.25 mn) as part of an effort to eradicate child labour.
Ravi took to launch a project "Raise hand to save our schools,’’ to convert schools without basic amenities into happy schools. Under this program, he took initiation to construct new school buildings, separate toilets for boys and girls. He took it upon himself to distribute five lakh benches free of cost to schools in Telangana. Over the last six years, he has managed to distribute 1.2 lakh benches worth Rs 30 crore.   Various school blocks and toilet blocks were built in different schools across Andhra Pradesh and Telangana states of India.

Under the ‘SHARE’ (Sanitation, Health and Rural Empowerment) project by The Rotary International, he participated in identifying beneficiaries and  provided 10,000 sewing machines and thousands of milch cattle to women in Guntur, Prakasam Districts ("End of Poverty" program) and sanitation facilities in 50 villages.

Ravi serves Red Cross Society as its member. As Chairman of Indian Red Cross, Guntur branch, he handed over a cheque for ₹ 15 lakh as a family contribution to the construction of a new Red Cross building in Guntur. Dr. Ravi presented the cheque to Chairman of AP Chapter Rachel Chateerjee, vice chairman Harpreet Singh and general secretary Balasubramaniam at a state meeting.

Under Round Table India, Ravi led an initiative of providing more than a lakh (100,000) school benches and furniture to Municipal and Zilla Parishad (district board) schools. 
As the president, Round Table India under the National Project "Right to Learn", he has monitored the construction of more than 130 School Buildings throughout the country in 62 cities.

He could accomplish this task owing to his association through service with the M.V. Foundation Mamidipudi Venkatarangaiya Foundation being led by the Magsaysay Award winner, Shanta Sinha. Ravi helped build 35 schools for Primary Education in Guntur district alone.
As Chairman of Asia Pacific Region of World Council of Service Clubs, Ravi actively involved himself in supporting the AIDS Program throughout the country and also in the Asia Pacific Region.

Ravi, in his capacity of convener of Tsunami Relief Cell of Rotary International, could prevail upon the global corporation GE Capital the need to help the tsuniami victims under Corporate Social Responsibility (CSR) initiative. A number of fishermen who had lost their boats, nets and their houses were given seven motorised fibre boats and 30 fishing nets to begin with at a cost of Rs. 14 lakhs.
Project HEAL (Health for All), a Rotary program, was leveraged to distribute more than 5,000 tricycles to the physically-challenged persons, help organise 10,000 cataract operations, provide medical equipment and ambulances to hospitals.
Under the Home for Humanity,  more than 500 houses, and over 3,000 toilets were constructed.

He is currently the Endowments/Major Gift Advisor, Audit committee member and chairman for Happy schools of the Literacy Mission and Zonal Coordinator for Wash in Schools.

He moderated Breakout Sessions at Rotary International Conventions on "Water for Life" at Salt Lake City, "Water for Life and End of Poverty is Possible" at Los Angeles Convention, "Doing Good in the World to make Dreams real" at Birmingham Convention, "Target One Billion by 2017" at Sao Pualo Convention. 
He was also a Guest speaker at District Conference of Dist 5470 at Colorado Springs, District 1100 United Kingdom and District 9640 Australia. Ravi is a member of the Directors Nominating Committee 2009 and 2015 and he is also a representative on Council on Representative 2007 and 2016.

Ravi was closely followed by his wife, Raaji, in his endeavour. Raaji also served as the District Governor of RI District 3150. Their work for Polio eradication was recognized and were awarded regional polio free award.

Ravi and Raaji are Level-4 Major Donors of the Rotary Foundation and they created Named Endowment Funds " Dr Ravi Vadlamani & Rajyalakshmi Endowment Fund", "Late V Bhaskara Lakshmi Endowment Fund" and "Late V Umamaheswara Rao Endowment Fund".

Awards
He has been awarded the Honorary Doctorate - "Doctor of Letters" Honoris Causa by Acharya Nagarjuna University for his Service to the Society as a Social Worker.
Service Above Self Award by Rotary International.
Certificate of Meritorious Service by The Rotary Foundation. 
Best Rotary District Governor in the World - 2001. 
Awarded Best Rotarian in Rotary District 3150 - 1989–90. 
Presidential Citation, Rotary for Four Avenues of Service - 1998. 
Member of the Arch Klumph Society
Best Area Chairman of Round Table India - 1995. 
Awarded the Distinguished Service Medallion by Association of Round Tables in Arabian Gulf. 
Best Floor Tabler, Round Table India - 1991.
Louis Marchesi Fellow.
He was awarded 13 Gold Medals by His' Excellence, The Governor of Andhra Pradesh for his Meritorious Services rendered to the Indian Red Cross Society.

References

Indian activists
Activists from Andhra Pradesh
Social workers
Indian social entrepreneurs
1956 births
Living people
Andhra University alumni
Indian accountants
Indian philanthropists